The Nervures Estive is a French single-place paraglider that was designed by Xavier Demoury and produced by Nervures of Soulom. It is now out of production.

Design and development
The Estive was designed as an intermediate glider. The models are each named for their relative size. The design progressed through two generations of models, the Estive and Estive 2, each improving on the last.

Variants
Estive 2 S
Small-sized model for lighter pilots. The glider model is AFNOR Standard certified.
Estive 2 M
Mid-sized model for medium-weight pilots. The glider model is AFNOR Standard certified.
Estive 2 L
Large-sized model for heavier pilots. The glider model is AFNOR Standard certified.
Estive 2 XL
Extra large-sized model for even heavier pilots. The glider model is AFNOR Standard certified.

Specifications (Estive 2 M)

References

Estive
Paragliders